News on Q is a Philippine television news broadcasting show broadcast by Q. Originally anchored by Ivan Mayrina and Rhea Santos, it premiered on November 11, 2005. The show concluded on February 18, 2011. Mayrina and Connie Sison served as the final anchors.

Overview
On March 5, 2007, Tagalog was changed to English. On January 5, 2009, the runtime was extended to 45 minutes. On April 5, 2010, the newscast was reverted to Tagalog, Connie Sison joined as an anchor and the runtime was changed to 60 minutes. On April 21, 2010, Santos left the program. The program aired its final episode on February 18, 2011.

Anchors
 Ivan Mayrina 
 Rhea Santos 
 Connie Sison 
 Grace Lee 
 Solita Monsod

References

2005 Philippine television series debuts
2011 Philippine television series endings
English-language television shows
Filipino-language television shows
Flagship evening news shows
Philippine television news shows
Q (TV network) news shows